Jeremy Nzeulie (born February 15, 1991) is a French-born Cameroonian basketball player for Saint-Quentin of the LNB Pro B.

Professional career
He made his French league Pro-A debut for club Nanterre during the 2008-2009 season. He spent one season with JSA Bordeaux and then returned to JSF Nanterre.

After the 2015–16 season, Nzeulie signed a two-year deal with Élan Chalon. In the 2016–17 season, Nzeulie won his second Pro A title after Chalon beat SIG Strasbourg 3–2 in the Finals. Nzeulie was named the Pro A Finals MVP.

In July 2018, Nzeulie signed a two-year contract with SIG Strasbourg.

On January 21, 2021, he has signed with Boulazac Basket Dordogne of the LNB Pro A.

On September 25, 2021, Nzeulie signed with Orléans Loiret Basket. He signed a contract until the end of the season on January 25, 2022.

International career
Nzeulie represents his country by playing for the Cameroon national basketball team. He played at AfroBasket 2013 and 2015 with Cameroon.

References

1991 births
Living people
People from Choisy-le-Roi
French sportspeople of Cameroonian descent
Citizens of Cameroon through descent
Sportspeople from Val-de-Marne
Boulazac Basket Dordogne players
Cameroonian men's basketball players
Élan Chalon players
JSA Bordeaux Basket players
French men's basketball players
Nanterre 92 players
Orléans Loiret Basket players
Point guards
Shooting guards
SIG Basket players